The name Kate has been used for nineteen tropical cyclones worldwide, five in the Atlantic Ocean, one in the western Pacific Ocean, ten in the western Pacific Ocean, and three in the Southern Hemisphere. 

In the Atlantic:
 Hurricane Kate (1985) – Category 3 hurricane, grazed Cuba, directly struck Panama City, Florida
 Hurricane Kate (2003) – Category 3 hurricane, brushed Newfoundland
 Hurricane Kate (2015) – Category 1 hurricane, brushed the Bahamas
 Tropical Storm Kate (2021) – weak and disorganized tropical storm which stayed at sea

In the Eastern Pacific:
 Hurricane Kate (1976) – briefly threatened Hawaii

In the western Pacific:
 Tropical Storm Kate (1945) – struck Japan
 Typhoon Kate (1951) (T5106) – affected Japan
 Typhoon Kate (1955) (T5521)
 Tropical Storm Kate (1959) (T5910, 20W)
 Typhoon Kate (1962) (T6206, 44W)
 Typhoon Kate (1964) (T6430, 45W) – struck Vietnam
 Typhoon Kate (1967) (T6719, 21W, Pepang)
 Typhoon Kate (1970) – killed 915 people in the Philippines
 Tropical Storm Kate (1973) (T7312, 13W)
 Typhoon Kate (1999) (T9901, 04W, Diding)

In the Southern Hemisphere:
 Cyclone Kate (1962) – South-West Indian Ocean cyclone that struck eastern Madagascar
 Cyclone Kate (2006) – short-lived (Australian region) Category 2 cyclone in the northwestern Coral Sea, not a threat to land
 Cyclone Kate (2014) – severe (Australian region) Category 4 cyclone that moved from the South-East Indian Ocean basin into the South-West Indian Ocean basin, not a threat to land

See also
List of storms named Katie, a similar named used in the Atlantic Ocean and the Southern Hemisphere

Atlantic hurricane set index articles
Pacific hurricane set index articles
Pacific typhoon set index articles
South-West Indian Ocean cyclone set index articles
Australian region cyclone set index articles